Iron Rock may refer to:

Iron Rock, New Jersey, unincorporated community in the United States
Iron Rock, Nova Scotia, community in Canada
IronRock Tap House, restaurant in Greensburg, PA